Hamsa (חמסה) was an Israeli musical quintet. The group was formed in 2001 by music producers Eyal Buchbut and Dror Margalit. The group got a breakthrough in the spring of 2003 with the single Chayav lamoot alai, followed by their debut album Hamsa, and shortly after disbanded, during 2004.

Members
Naama Atal
Eti Castro
Pazit Hermon
Carmi Shimron
Yasmin Suissa

Israeli pop music groups
Israeli girl groups